Ana Nuño (born 29 July 1957) is a poet and writer. She was born in Caracas, Venezuela. She currently lives in Barcelona, Spain.

Nuño has a PhD in English Studies from La Sorbonne, Paris. Her main fields of research and work are poetry, journalism and politics. As a poet, she has seen her Spanish-language work published in Spain, as well as in several anthologies in Venezuela, Colombia, Argentina, Mexico, Brazil and the USA. Her poetry has been translated into French, English, Italian and Portuguese.

Her essays, articles and criticism on literature, politics and cinema have been published, among other media, in Vuelta (Mexico); Syntaxis, Quimera, El Viejo Topo, La Vanguardia, Letras Libres (España); El Nacional and El Universal (Venezuela).

She was chief editor of Quimera from 1997 to 2001. In 2004, she founded the publishing house Reverso Ediciones with Carla Palacio and continues to direct it. In 2005 she participated in founding a new political party in Spain: Ciutadans de Catalunya.

Works 

 Las voces encontradas. Málaga: Dador, 1989.
 Sextinario. Caracas: Tierra de Gracia, 1999; Barcelona: Plaza & Janés, 2002.
 Lezama Lima. Barcelona: Omega, 2001.

External links 
 Selected poems, BarcelonaReview.com; accessed 19 December 2017.
 Essays & Statements by Ana Nuño , Ciutadans-ciudadanos.net; accessed 19 December 2017.

1957 births
University of Paris alumni
Venezuelan emigrants to Spain
Venezuelan women poets
Writers from Caracas
Living people
20th-century Venezuelan women writers
20th-century Venezuelan poets
21st-century Venezuelan women writers
21st-century Venezuelan poets